Harmonyville is an unincorporated community and census-designated place (CDP) in the town of Townshend, Windham County, Vermont, United States. As of the 2020 census, it had a population of 92.

The CDP is in north-central Windham County, in the southern part of the town of Townshend. It is bordered to the north by the village of Townshend. It sits in the valley of the West River, where it is joined from the northeast by Mill Brook. The West River is a southeast-flowing tributary of the Connecticut River.

Vermont Route 30 passes through the community, leading southeast  to Brattleboro and northwest through Townshend village  to Manchester Center.

References 

Populated places in Windham County, Vermont
Census-designated places in Windham County, Vermont
Census-designated places in Vermont